Roman Valeryevich Murtazayev (born 10 September 1993) is a Kazakh footballer who plays for Shakhter Karagandy and the Kazakhstan national football team.

Career

Club
In December 2015, Murtazayev signed for FC Irtysh Pavlodar.

On 24 August 2016, FC Astana announced that they had signed Murtazayev to a three-year contract, from the end of the 2016 season. Murtazayev left Astana at the end of his contract on 25 December 2019.

On 7 February 2020, FC Tobol announced the signing of Murtazayev on a one-year contract.

On 23 February 2021, Murtazayev returned to FC Astana. On 16 July 2021, Murtazayev left Astana by mutual consent. After leaving Astana Murtazayev signed a one-year contract, with the option of an additional year, with Baltika Kaliningrad on 28 July 2021. On 1 December 2021, his contract with Baltika was terminated by mutual consent.

On 11 January 2022, Murtazayev re-signed for Shakhter Karagandy.

Career statistics

Club

International

Statistics accurate as of match played 24 March 2022

International goals

Scores and results list Kazakhstan's goal tally first.

References

External links

Living people
1993 births
Kazakhstani footballers
Association football forwards
Kazakhstan international footballers
Kazakhstan Premier League players
FC Shakhter Karagandy players
FC Irtysh Pavlodar players
FC Astana players
FC Baltika Kaliningrad players
Russian First League players
Sportspeople from Karaganda
Kazakhstani expatriate footballers
Expatriate footballers in Russia
Kazakhstani expatriate sportspeople in Russia